Lawrence Mervyn Wallace (9 March 1917 – 1978) was an English amateur athlete who competed as a sprinter in the 1938 British Empire Games and played football for Southampton.

Early life

Wallace was born in Sandown on the Isle of Wight and studied at Southampton's University College.

Athletic career
At the 1938 Empire Games, he was a member of the English relay team which won the silver medal in the 4×110 yards event. In the 100 yards competition as well as in the 220 yards contest he was eliminated in the heats.

Football career

Wallace was selected to represent the Universities Athletic Union against an Amateur XI in a football match played at The Dell in February 1939. Wallace's abilities on the left-wing brought him to the attention of the Saints' management, who immediately signed him as an amateur.

He made his first-team debut at Maine Road against Manchester City on 18 March 1939, in place of Harry Osman, who had been sold to Millwall. Reports suggest that Wallace found his debut "somewhat overwhelming" and he "struggled to find any rhythm". Wallace returned to the reserves whilst continuing his education and made a few appearances for the reserves during the Second World War.

References

External links
Empire Games results
Football career details

1917 births
People from Sandown
1978 deaths
Alumni of the University of Southampton
English male sprinters
Athletes (track and field) at the 1938 British Empire Games
Commonwealth Games silver medallists for England
Commonwealth Games medallists in athletics
English footballers
Association football forwards
Southampton F.C. players
English Football League players
Medallists at the 1938 British Empire Games